The Karoko hill rat (Bunomys karokophilus) is a species of rodent in the family Muridae. It is found only in Sulawesi, Indonesia.

References

Bunomys
Rats of Asia
Endemic fauna of Indonesia
Rodents of Sulawesi
Mammals described in 2014
Taxa named by Guy Musser